Charl Adriaan Schwartzel (born 31 August 1984) is a South African professional golfer who currently plays in the LIV Golf Invitational Series and has previously played on the PGA Tour, European Tour and the Sunshine Tour. He has won one major title, the Masters in 2011. Schwartzel's highest world ranking has been number six, after finishing in a tie for fourth at the WGC-Cadillac Championship in 2012.

Early life and amateur career
Born in Johannesburg, Schwartzel had a dominant junior amateur career in South Africa, and won some amateur events in other countries including the 2002 Indian Amateur and English Open Stroke Play Championships. He played for South Africa in the 2002 Eisenhower Trophy.

Professional career
Schwartzel turned professional at the age of eighteen and following the path of many other leading South African players, he qualified for the European Tour late that year. He was the second youngest South African golfer to do so after Dale Hayes. He earned enough money to retain his European Tour card in both 2003 and 2004.

In the 2005 season he won the Dunhill Championship, a leading tournament in South Africa that is co-sanctioned by the European Tour, and claimed first place on the Sunshine Tour's Order of Merit. In 2005 he finished 52nd on the European Tour's Order of Merit, and in 2005-06 he again topped the Sunshine Tour Order of Merit. His win at the season-ending Vodacom Tour Championship took him into the top 100 in the Official World Golf Rankings for the first time. His form continued to improve in 2006 and he finished the season placed 18th on the Order of Merit and reached as high as 55th in the World Rankings.

He took first place on the Sunshine Tour Order of Merit for the third consecutive year in 2007, and won the Open de España in April, beating Jyoti Randhawa by one stroke, after an eagle at the  par-5 16th hole, and moved into the world top 40.

Schwartzel has played in the Gary Player Invitational several times to help Gary Player raise funds for various children's charities. In 2008, he once again achieved success on the European Tour, by securing victory at the Madrid Masters. 

After a winless 2009 season, Schwartzel started 2010 by winning two consecutive tournaments on the European Tour, both held in his native South Africa, and re-entered the top 50 of the Official World Golf Rankings. He finished the season ranked 8th on the Order of Merit.

For 2011, Schwartzel joined the PGA Tour. On 16 January 2011, Schwartzel retained his Joburg Open title winning by four shots.

2011 Masters win
Schwartzel won the Masters Tournament in 2011 by two strokes to become the third South African winner of the event (after Gary Player and Trevor Immelman). He won exactly 50 years after Player became the first international Masters champion in 1961. In the final round, Schwartzel overcame a four stroke deficit with a round of 66, two strokes ahead of runners-up Adam Scott and Jason Day

Schwartzel started his final round on Sunday by chipping in from off the green at the first hole for birdie and then holed his second shot from the middle of the fairway at the third for eagle. This wiped out the four stroke lead of Rory McIlroy, but then Schwartzel bogeyed the fourth hole to drop one behind. For the rest of the round he maintained this score, until he reached the last four holes where he holed clutch putts to finish with four consecutive birdies, a feat unprecedented in the Masters' 75 years history. It put him back in the lead and he ultimately won the Green Jacket and his first major championship. After the tournament, Schwartzel moved up to 11th from 29th in the Official World Golf Rankings.

Post-Masters win career

Alongside his win at The Masters, Schwartzel also enjoyed success in the year's other three major championships in 2011. He recorded career bests at the U.S. Open where he finished in a tie for ninth and also at the PGA Championship, finishing tied for 12th. He was also in contention at The Open Championship before a third round 75 damaged his chances. He ended the season ranked 4th on the Race to Dubai. 

On 9 December 2012, Schwartzel won the Thailand Golf Championship on the Asian Tour for his first victory since his 2011 Masters win. This was also Schwartzel's first win on the Asian Tour as he cruised to an eleven stroke victory over the field. The following week, Schwartzel won in his native South Africa at the Alfred Dunhill Championship played at Leopard Creek CC.

This was Schwartzel's eighth victory on the European Tour, as he secured it with the third highest margin of victory in the history of the tour with a twelve stroke advantage over the Swede Kristoffer Broberg.

Schwartzel defended his Alfred Dunhill Championship in 2013, with a four-stroke win over England's Richard Finch. This took his tally of victories on the European Tour to nine.

Schwartzel won his second PGA Tour event, on 13 March 2016, taking the Valspar Championship on the first hole of sudden-death, after tying Bill Haas at 277 after 72 holes.

On May 31, 2022, it was revealed that Schwartzel would be participating in the first event of the Saudi-backed LIV Golf tour. Schwartzel would end up resigning his PGA Tour membership. On June 9, Schwartzel along with 16 others, were suspended by the PGA Tour. Since he resigned his membership before the first event, Schwartzel is no longer eligible to compete in PGA Tour events or the Presidents Cup.

In June 2022, Schwartzel won the inaugural LIV Golf tournament, the LIV Golf Invitational London, by one stroke over Hennie du Plessis. His team, consisting of himself, du Plessis, Branden Grace and Louis Oosthuizen, won the team portion of the event by fourteen strokes.

Amateur wins
2002 Indian Amateur Open Championship (tied), Brabazon Trophy, Transvaal Amateur Championship (South Africa)

Professional wins (16)

PGA Tour wins (2)

PGA Tour playoff record (1–1)

European Tour wins (11)

1Co-sanctioned by the Sunshine Tour

European Tour playoff record (1–1)

Asian Tour wins (1)

Sunshine Tour wins (9)

1Co-sanctioned by the European Tour

Sunshine Tour playoff record (1–1)

OneAsia Tour wins (1)

LIV Golf Invitational Series wins (1)

Major championships

Wins (1)

Results timeline
Results not in chronological order in 2020.

CUT = missed the half-way cut
"T" = tied
NT = No tournament due to COVID-19 pandemic

Summary

Most consecutive cuts made – 11 (2009 PGA – 2012 U.S. Open)
Longest streak of top-10s – 2 (2011 Masters – 2011 U.S. Open)

Results in The Players Championship

CUT = missed the halfway cut
"T" indicates a tie for a place
C = Cancelled after the first round due to the COVID-19 pandemic

Results in World Golf Championships
Results not in chronological order prior to 2015.

QF, R16, R32, R64 = Round in which player lost in match play
"T" = tied
Note that the HSBC Champions did not become a WGC event until 2009.

Team appearances
Amateur
Eisenhower Trophy (representing South Africa): 2002

Professional
Presidents Cup (representing the International team): 2011, 2013, 2015, 2017
World Cup (representing South Africa): 2011

See also
List of golfers with most European Tour wins

References

External links

South African male golfers
Sunshine Tour golfers
European Tour golfers
PGA Tour golfers
LIV Golf players
Winners of men's major golf championships
Golfers from Johannesburg
Sportspeople from Gauteng
People from Vereeniging
Afrikaner people
1984 births
Living people